Smbataberd  (Armenian: Սմբատաբերդ; meaning Fortress of Smbat the Prince of Syunik) is a fortress located upon the crest of a hill between the villages of Artabuynk and Yeghegis in the Vayots Dzor Province of Armenia.

Site 
Smbataberd was built in a very advantageous position on the southern end of a ridge, guarded by steep cliffs on three of its sides. Very large ramparts with towers are still relatively intact on the exterior. Within the confines of the fortress little remains except for the faint foundations of buildings near the fortification walls and a keep located at the highest point of the site.

History 
It is likely that Smbataberd was founded during the 5th century, but was better established and heavily fortified during the 9th to 10th centuries.

The fortress received water from an underground clay pipe leading from the Tsaghats Kar Monastery. Local legend tells that Smbataberd was captured by the Seljuq Turks in a similar manner as the fortress of Proshaberd, where a thirsty horse was used to sniff out the pipeline so as to cut off the water supply to the fortress. 

Because of dates relating to the destruction of the Tsakhats Kar and its later restoration in 1221, and the destruction of the village of Yeghegis toward the end of the 11th century, it would be assumed that the fortress also fell to invading forces during the 11th century. There is some evidence though that suggests the fortress was defended until the 13th century, which would mean that it may have possibly been captured by Mongol forces rather than those of the Seljuq Turks.

References

External links
 Armeniapedia.org: Smbataberd

Archaeological sites in Armenia
Castles in Armenia
Forts in Armenia
Tourist attractions in Vayots Dzor Province
Buildings and structures in Vayots Dzor Province